Helena Casas Roigé (born 27 July 1988) is a track cyclist from  Catalonia. She represented Spain at the 2007, 2009, 2012, 2013, 2014 and 2015 UCI Track Cycling World Championships.

Casas competed for the Spanish track cycling team at the 2016 Summer Olympics. There, she finished seventh, alongside her partner Tania Calvo, in the women's team sprint, and rode a flying lap of 11.707 seconds in the qualifying round of the individual sprint race, which left her in the penultimate position against a field of 26 other competitors.

Career results

2008
Grand Prix International Ville de Barcelone 
1st Keirin
1st 500m Time Trial
2013
Copa Internacional de Pista
1st Team Sprint (with Tania Calvo)
2nd Keirin
2nd Sprint
2014
International Track Women & Men
1st Keirin
2nd Sprint
Trofeu Ciutat de Barcelona
1st Keirin
1st Sprint
Prova Internacional de Anadia
2nd Keirin
2nd Sprint
2015
2nd Keirin, Irish International Track GP
Trofeu Ciutat de Barcelona
2nd Keirin
2nd Sprint
Prova Internacional de Anadia
2nd Keirin
2nd Sprint
2016
Prova Internacional de Anadia
1st Keirin
1st Sprint
Fenioux France Trophy
1st Sprint
2nd Keirin
Trofeu Ciutat de Barcelona
2nd Keirin
2nd Sprint
3rd Keirin, Trofeu CAR Anadia Portugal
2017
TROFEU CIUTAT DE BARCELONA-Memorial Miquel Poblet 
1st Keirin
2nd Sprint
3rd Keirin, Belgian International Track Meeting

References

External links
 
 
 
 

1988 births
Living people
Spanish female cyclists
Sportspeople from Tarragona
Olympic cyclists of Spain
Cyclists at the 2016 Summer Olympics
European Games competitors for Spain
Cyclists at the 2019 European Games
Cyclists from Catalonia
21st-century Spanish women